The Dresleuca is a right tributary of the river Sitna in Romania. It flows into the Sitna near Bălușenii Noi.

References

Rivers of Romania
Rivers of Botoșani County